"The Traveller" may refer to several people:

People
 Bengt Bengtsson Oxenstierna (1591–1643), Swedish diplomat sometimes called Resare-Bengt ("Bengt the Traveller")
 Daniel the Traveller, first travel writer from the Kievan Rus
 Pausanias (geographer), 2nd century travel writer
 Billy Pinnell (died 1977), sports editor of the Bristol Evening Post from 1932 to 1956, who use the pen name "The Traveller"

In Norse mythology
 Eric the Taveller, subject of the saga Eireks saga víðförla
 Ratatoskr (Tusk the Traveller, according to scholar Guðbrandur Vigfússon), a squirrel who carries messages up and down the world tree Yggdrasil

See also
 Ingvar the Far-Travelled, 11th century Swedish Viking who led an expedition that fought in Georgia
 List of people known as the Pilgrim

Traveller